A Go Go is an album by the jazz guitarist John Scofield. It is his first collaboration with Medeski Martin & Wood.

Track listing 
All compositions by John Scofield.

Japanese release bonus tracks

Personnel
John Scofield – electric & acoustic guitars, whistle
John Medeski – organ, Wurlitzer, clavinet, piano
Chris Wood – acoustic & electric basses
Billy Martin – drums, tambourine

References 

1997 albums
Post-bop albums
John Scofield albums
Verve Records albums